Wivenhoe is a locality and suburb of Burnie in the local government area of City of Burnie, in the North West region of Tasmania. The northern boundary is formed by Bass Strait, and the western by the Emu River. The 2016 Australian census determined a population of 220 for the state suburb of Wivenhoe.

History
Wivenhoe is believed to be named for Wivenhoe in England.

Road infrastructure
The Bass Highway passes east–west along the shore of the Bass Strait. The C102 route (Stowport Road) terminates at the Bass Highway in Wivenhoe. It runs south-west through the locality to Stowport, and from there provides access to several other localities and the Murchison Highway.

References

Suburbs of Burnie, Tasmania
Towns in Tasmania